Ginny Aur Johnny is a 1976 Indian Hindi-language comedy-drama film. Produced by Amarlal Chabria and directed by Mehmood the film stars Mehmood, Amjad Khan, Helen, Rajesh Khanna, Hema Malini, Rishi Kapoor, Randhir Kapoor, Vinod Mehra, Nutan, Rakesh Roshan and Baby Ginny, who is Mehmood's own daughter. The film is based on Hollywood movie Paper Moon.

Plot
The story is of a man named Johnny and a nine-year-old girl Ginny who is Mehmood's daughter. Ginny's mother Rosie dies in an accident and Ginny is left alone. Johnny comes to visit Rosie and during this time he learns about her death. Thus, her villagers request Johnny to take Ginny to an orphanage at Ooty.

On the other hand, Johnny, a con man, visits those places where somebody had died and by taking their names, he sells holy books to the families. While travelling to Ooty, he continues his work. The journey consists of beautiful slapstick events and how they banter with each other.

Music
The film's music is by Rajesh Roshan, while all the songs are written by Majrooh Sultanpuri.

Cast 
 Mehmood as Johnny
 Baby Ginni as Ginni
 Amjad Khan	as Gabbar Singh
 Helen	as Johnny's girlfriend
 Rajesh Khanna as in a special appearance as the Inspector
 Bhushan Tiwari as
 Nutan	as Rosie's sister
 Randhir Kapoor as	Dabbu
 Vinod Mehra as a Mechanic
 Rishi Kapoor in a guest role
 Hema Malini as Rosie (Ginny's mother)
 Rakesh Roshan
 Preeti Ganguly as Sweety
 Imtiaz Khan as Inspector (brother of Gabbar Singh)
 Sunder
 Asit Sen as Hawaldaar
 Dev Kumar	as Police Commissioner
 Mohan Choti
 Leela Mishra
 Shailendra Singh

Production 
Mehmood went to the United States to visit his in-laws, as he used to do annually. While there, he watched the American film Paper Moon, and decided to adapt it in Hindi with the title Ginny Aur Johnny.

References

External links 
 

1976 films
1970s Hindi-language films
Films scored by Rajesh Roshan